WRB, or wrb, may refer to:

 War Refugee Board
 World Reference Base for Soil Resources
 W. R. Berkley Corporation, NYSE ticker WRB
 WRB Refining LLC, operators of Wood River Refinery, Illinois, U.S.
 WRB, a part-of-speech tag in the Brown Corpus
 WRB. the IATA code for Robins Air Force Base in Georgia, U.S.
 wrb, the ISO 639 language code for the Warluwarra language, an extinct Australian Aboriginal language
 WRB. the National Rail code for Wrabness railway station in Essex, UK
 Wright b antigen (Wrb), located on Glycophorin A

See also